Saverio is a given name of Italian origin. It is a cognate of Xavier and Javier, both of which originate from Xabier, the Basque name for the Spanish town Javier. Xabier is itself the romanization of etxe berri meaning "new house" or "new home".

People
 Given name
Sav Rocca (Saverio Giovanni Rocca) (born 1973), Australian professional American football player in the USA
Saverio Bettinelli (1718–1808), Italian writer
Saverio Costanzo (born 1975), Italian film director
Saverio Fava (1832–1913), first Italian ambassador to the USA
Saverio Gandini (1729–1796), Italian painter of the late-Baroque and Neoclassic periods
Saverio Mammoliti (born 1942), Italian 'Ndrangheta boss from Oppido Mamertina and Castellace in Calabria
Saverio Mercadante (1795–1870), Italian composer

 Middle name
Francesco Saverio Romano (born 1964), Italian politician and lawyer

References

Italian masculine given names

ja:サヴェリオ